Miloš Spasić (born 29 January 1998) is a Serbian professional footballer who plays as a defender for Greek Super League 2 club Kavala.

References

External links
Miloš Spasić at OEFB

Serbian footballers
Austrian Football Bundesliga players
1998 births
Living people
FC Admira Wacker Mödling players
Association football defenders